Allandale railway station was a rail station proposed for the line between Cumbernauld and Falkirk near the villages of Allandale and Castlecary. The station was recommended in the Scottish Executive's "Central Scotland Transport Corridor Studies", published in January, 2003 as Castlecary railway station. However, the scheme's promoters were persuaded to change the name of the station to avoid confusion with an existing Castle Cary railway station in Castle Cary, Somerset.

The proposed Allandale station was to have been sited on the former Castlecary brickworks.  Services intended for the station included those from Glasgow Queen Street to Falkirk Grahamston; a new service from the station to Queen Street; and a half-hourly service between Motherwell and Stirling.

Plans for the station were abandoned in favour of an alternative park and ride facility at Bannockburn, according to Scottish Parliament written answers for 23 August 2007.

References 

Disused railway stations in Falkirk (council area)
Proposed railway stations in Scotland